George Henry Armitage (17 January 1898 – 28 August 1936) was a footballer who played in The Football League for Charlton Athletic. He also made one appearance for England. He was born in Stoke Newington, England.

References 

1898 births
1936 deaths
English footballers
England international footballers
Charlton Athletic F.C. players
Wimbledon F.C. players
English Football League players
Leyton F.C. players
Footballers from Stoke Newington
Association football defenders